Gregory Lynn Frost (born April 17, 1949) is a former United States district judge of the United States District Court for the Southern District of Ohio.

Education and career

Born in Newark, Ohio, Frost received a Bachelor of Arts degree from Wittenberg University in 1971 and a Juris Doctor from the Claude W. Pettit College of Law at Ohio Northern University in 1974. He was an Assistant prosecuting attorney of Licking County Prosecuting Attorney's Office, Ohio from 1974 to 1978, entering private practice in Ohio from 1978 to 1983. He was a judge on the Licking County Municipal Court from 1983 to 1990, and on the Licking County Common Pleas Court from 1990 to 2003.

District court service

On January 7, 2003, Frost was nominated by President George W. Bush to a seat on the United States District Court for the Southern District of Ohio vacated by George Curtis Smith. Frost was confirmed by the United States Senate on March 10, 2003, and received his commission on March 11, 2003. He retired on May 2, 2016.

Sources

External links

1949 births
Living people
Ohio state court judges
Judges of the United States District Court for the Southern District of Ohio
United States district court judges appointed by George W. Bush
21st-century American judges
Wittenberg University alumni
Claude W. Pettit College of Law alumni
People from Newark, Ohio